KUSN 98.1 FM is a radio station licensed to Dearing, Kansas.  The station broadcasts a country music format and is owned by Sek Media, LLC.

History of call letters
In previous years, the call letters KUSN were assigned to an AM station in San Diego, California.
During the period from 1955 until 1979, the KUSN call letters were assigned to an AM station on 1270 kHz in St. Joseph, MO, now licensed as KGNM.  KUSN-FM was assigned to St.Joseph, MO from 1960 until 1979, the FM assignment now carries the KKJO-FM call sign.  KUSN-FM was later assigned to Pueblo, Colorado from 1986 to 1988 at 107.1 FM.

References

External links
KUSN-FM's website (within www.kggfradio.com)

USN
Country radio stations in the United States
Radio stations established in 1999
1999 establishments in Kansas